The New Jersey State Youth Orchestra (NJSYO) is a youth orchestra based in New Jersey, United States. It was established as an independent non-profit organization in Red Bank, NJ in 1977 after being founded in 1972 as a program of the New Jersey State Orchestra, and is the oldest independent youth orchestra in continuous operation in New Jersey.

The NJSYO operates a variety of orchestral and ensemble music programs for young people which include public performance opportunities. The NJSYO is currently in residence at the Middletown Arts Center.

The current Music Director is Ben Ringer, who was selected as the 2019 Outstanding Educator in Performing Arts by the Monmouth Arts Council for his work with the NJSYO. Previous Music Directors include Alexander Yudkovsky, Executive Director of The School for Strings, Roy D. Gussman, Music Director of the Monmouth Symphony Orchestra, Daniel Spalding, Music Director of Capital Philharmonic of New Jersey, and William Berz, Director of the Department of Music at Rutgers University.

References

American youth orchestras
Orchestras based in New Jersey
Youth organizations based in New Jersey